Hanford may refer to:

Places 
Hanford (constituency), a constituency in Tuen Mun, People's Republic of China
Hanford, Dorset, a village and parish in England
Hanford, Staffordshire, England
Hanford, California, United States
Hanford, Iowa, United States
Hanford, Washington, a community depopulated by the U.S. government in March 1943

Schools
 Hanford School, a school in Hanford, Dorset
 Hanford High School, a high school in Richland, Washington

Other uses
Hanford (surname)
Hanford Site, a nuclear complex
Hanford Tri-State Airlines or Mid-Continent Airlines
USS Hanford

People with the given name
 Hanford Dixon (born 1958), American football player and sports announcer
 Hanford MacNider (1889–1968), American diplomat and US Army General

See also 
Handford, a surname
Hanford Carnegie Museum
Hanford Reach, a free-flowing section of the Columbia River
Hanford Reach National Monument